Country Reports on Terrorism is an annual report published by the United States Department of State. In 2005 it replaced the Patterns of Global Terrorism report, which had been released since 1985.

The report is published in accordance with Title 22, Section 2656(f) of the United States Code, which requires the Secretary of State to submit to Congress an annual report on terrorism.

History
When the Patterns of Global Terrorism report for 2003 was released in April 2004, many errors were noted within it. The report did not list all the attacks considered to be terrorism that year, including major bombings in Istanbul and Iraq, and the statistics on terrorism were lower than outsiders thought they should have been.

In response to this criticism, the State Department released a revised report in June 2004, correcting most of the errors; however, this was not enough to stop some critics from saying the State Department had deliberately left out information showing failures in the War on Terror.

When it came time to release the PoGT for 2004 in April 2005, the State Department announced it was getting rid of that report and replacing it with the Country Reports on Terrorism. The official reason was that the old method of gathering data was outdated and the new report featured a better collection of information.

Summary
The Country Reports on Terrorism does not provide any statistics on terrorism like its predecessor. It simply has several chapters dealing with a country and any progress it has made in fighting the War on Terrorism.

However, a separate report released by the National Counterterrorism Center gave a chronology of "significant terrorist events," something not featured in the Country Reports. That report said there were 651 "significant" attacks in 2004, which left 1,907 people killed and around 8,000 wounded. These figures were the highest in 21 years of compiled data on terrorism.

The National Counterterrorism Center Country Reports on Terrorism 2005 included a Statistical Annex, according to which there were 11,111 terrorist attacks in 2005 of which 3,474 occurred in Iraq and 489 occurred in Afghanistan.

≈≈Yearly Reports summarized≈≈
                                       Country Reports on Terrorism 2004

This is a summary of the report produced by the Secretary of State for Congress. 
In 2004, the fight against terrorism continues; the struggle is full of success and failures. Both the terrorist and those that fight against them have had losses. Many countries have been attacked by terrorists on their home soil; the United States has been fortunate in that area. The United States has only lost citizens in other countries while fighting for the war on terrorism; those lost were fighting in Iraq, Saudi Arabia, Afghanistan, Egypt, and Gaza. The majority of the lives lost were of the other nationality and of the Islamic faith. The counties that were hit the hardest were Russia, Spain, and The Philippines. While other countries have been attacked in the last year, these counties had the largest casualty of those injured or killed.

Al-Qaida is weaker of the late because the United States and allies around the world the globe have been working on eliminating major players in al-Qaida's leadership. Some of those that were killed Khalid Ali Al-Hajj, Abdulaziz al-Muqrin, and Amjad Farooqui. There have been deaths and capture terrorist by governments around the world including Pakistani, Filipino, British, and many other places.  The men captured were the ones in charge of communication for al-Qaida, and the plan to attack assets of the United States and allies. These countries efforts have resulted in the capture or death of terrorists, some local terrorist groups while others were part of al-Qaida. While quite a few leaders are eliminated, there are still many leaders that have not been caught that are planning more attacks against the United States and allies.

Evan as its power diminishes; the ideology of al-Qaida strengthens as the influence of the ideology is taken up by others as their new belief. Smaller groups have even officially joined the cause of al-Qaida and gained official recognition from al-Qaida. Some of the groups that are known to support al-Qaida are Abu Musab, the unknown jihadist in Madrid, and the new leader of the GSPC in Algeria to name a few. Other unofficially supports al-Qaida's cause by following in the ideology's of al-Qaida and battle.  Now that al-Qaida is growing weaker, the small local groups and smaller cells of al-Qaida have taken over the preparation for attacks from planning to the gathering of supplies. The cells and small groups are all around the world, the known ones can be found from Saudi Arabia to East Africa. They are responsible for the attacks on the United States Embassies in Nairobi and in Dar es Salaam and much more.  There are still many extremists rising to cause more chaos and plan more ways to spread their views.

Their new allegiances have carried out attacks across the globe from Saudi Arabia to Indonesia. The battle is now with smaller groups following the example of al-Qaida.  Since the numbers of targets have increased and have spread the world, the counterterrorism community has adapted.  The United States worked hard to deepen their connections to other counties and build trust between agencies. They work closer together than ever to prevent attacks around the globes and the ideology of al-Qaida to spreading even further.  The efforts have prevented attacks in airports and against the United States financial institution. While the United States and allies in the war against terrorism are focused mainly on al-Qaida and those that work under al-Qaida's ideology, they are also working tirelessly to prevent other extreme groups both terrorist or radicals from gaining control. If they do end up gaining, power the counter-terrorism agency of all counties work together on preventing attacks. They have been successful in preventing most of the attacks. The attack on the United States financial institution was prevented by sharing information with the United Kingdom and Pakistan. The airports are more secure and safe out of combined efforts of counties around the world coordinating with The United States. The United States also fighting terrorism by helping governments that are fighting terrorism on their homeland with training.

References

External links

Country Reports on Terrorism, U.S. Department of State
Terror threat to U.S. called 'significant' - CNN

Government documents of the United States
War on terror
United States Department of State publications